Ready Money Creek is a stream in Yukon–Koyukuk Census Area, Alaska, in the United States.

The name was recorded by the United States Geological Survey in 1952.

See also
List of rivers of Alaska

References

Rivers of Yukon–Koyukuk Census Area, Alaska
Rivers of Alaska
Rivers of Unorganized Borough, Alaska